Agdistis pygmaea is a moth in the family Pterophoridae. It is known from Israel.

The wingspan is about 14 mm. The forewings and hindwings are grey.

References

Agdistinae
Moths described in 1955